HMS Intelligent was launched in 1805 at Bridport as a Confounder-class gunbrig. She was the only Royal Navy vessel to be named Intelligent. She had an uneventful career. The Admiralty tried to sell her in 1805, but the sale fell through and she became a mooring lighter that was still in service in 1864.

Career
Lieutenant Nicholas Tucker commissioned Intelligent in October 1805.

On 22 August Intelligent was in sight, together with a number of other warships, when  captured Minerva.

Intelligent was among the vessels that shared in the prize money for the capture of Copenhagen in 1807.

On 6 March 1809 the schooner Mermede, a prize to Intelligent came into Falmouth. Intelligent had captured Arminde on 4 March.

On 5 October 1810 Intelligent boarded  as Quaker was returning to London from Trinidad.

On 3 August 1812 Charles, Edg___, master came into Plymouth. She had been sailing in ballast from Portsmouth to America when Intelligent detained her. Intelligent had captured Charles, Elwell, master, on 1 August.

Fate
The "Principal Officers and Commissioners of His Majesty's Navy" first offered the "Intelligent gunbrig, of 181 tons", lying at Portsmouth, for sale on 23 March 1815.

Intelligent was put into ordinary in July 1815. She was finally sold for £610 on 14 October.

The sale fell through when purchaser refused to accept Intelligent. She was fitted at Portsmouth between August and September 1816 as a mooring lighter. By 1864 she was mooring lighter No.4. Her ultimate fate is unknown.

Notes, citations, and references
Notes

Citations

References
 

Royal Navy ship names
1805 ships
Brigs of the Royal Navy